This is a list of Portuguese television related events from 2009.

Events

Debuts
4 October - Ídolos (2003-2005, 2009–present)

Television shows

2000s
Operação triunfo (2003-2011)

Ending this year

Births

Deaths